Melvin Nicholas "Mel" Zajac (23 April 1956 – 13 July 1986) was a Canadian swimmer. He competed in the men's 100 metre breaststroke at the 1976 Summer Olympics.

Zajac died in a kayak accident when his kayak got caught in a tide pool and overturned. His brother Marty died in an avalanche eight months later in Cariboo.

References

External links
 

1956 births
1986 deaths
Canadian male breaststroke swimmers
Olympic swimmers of Canada
Swimmers at the 1976 Summer Olympics
Swimmers from Vancouver
Pan American Games competitors for Canada
Swimmers at the 1975 Pan American Games
20th-century Canadian people